Forsaken is a 2015 Canadian revisionist western film directed by Jon Cassar, from a screenplay by Brad Mirman. The film stars Kiefer Sutherland, Donald Sutherland, Brian Cox, Michael Wincott, Aaron Poole and Demi Moore. The film had its world premiere at the 2015 Toronto International Film Festival on September 16, 2015. The film was released on February 19, 2016. One of the executive producers on the film was Doug Falconer.

Synopsis 
A flashback shows a young boy, recently dead, and his distraught mother.  John Henry Clayton (Kiefer Sutherland) returns home to his father, Reverend Samuel Clayton (Donald Sutherland), who informs him his mother has died some years ago.  John Henry was unaware, as he had been drifting for 10 years following his time fighting in the Civil War.  John Henry and Samuel are estranged because Samuel is ashamed of his son's supposed exploits following the War.  He goes to town with his father who warns him to avoid some suspicious men; their leader, saloon owner James McCurdy (Brian Cox) worries that John Henry will be a "problem."  John Henry also encounters his past lover, Mary Alice (Demi Moore), whom he learns is married and has a son.

After a tense encounter in town with Frank Tillman (McCurdy's thug), John Henry and his father argue about his exploits and lack of faith in God following the atrocities of the Civil War.  McCurdy's gang, along with "Gentleman" Dave Turner (Michael Wincott), rides to a farm to coerce a man to leave.  Another cowboy murders the man, to Dave's dismay, and Dave kills him in return.  Some time later, when Frank goes to another farm to remove its owner, others in town ambush them.  McCurdy grows increasingly aggressive in his attempts to displace the local landowners to suppress their rebellion.  In town, Tom Watson (Mary Alice's husband) sees her talking with John Henry; John Henry has yet another run in with McCurdy's gang and allows a man named Ned to beat him without retaliation.  Tom is angered when Mary Alice rides off to nurse John Henry.

Now concerned about his wife's feelings, Tom is persuaded by McCurdy to simply sell his land and move away so that John Henry could not "steal" his wife.  Dave Turner warns John Henry not to get involved in the land scheme, and they discover that they were both at the Battle of Shiloh, albeit on opposite sides.  That Sunday, John Henry finally attends his father's church service where Tom angrily demands that he deny loving Mary Alice - John Henry silently leaves.  Tom tries to get out of the deal with McCurdy, realizing he cannot change John Henry's feelings, but is refused.  John Henry returns to the church, where he tearfully admits to his father that after the War, he accidentally shot and killed a boy with a stray shot in a self-defense gunfight.  He is haunted by the memory of that boy and his brother William, who accidentally died when he fell in a freezing river.  Samuel forgives and comforts him.

McCurdy threatens Mary Alice, convinced Tom is still bound by their deal, so Mary Alice pleads with John Henry to help her - he refuses.  Samuel then appeals to McCurdy to leave Tom's family alone, but is also refused.  When he leaves, Ned stabs him in the back in an alley.  John Henry stays with him until he regains consciousness, then informs him that he must end the violence in town.  John Henry retrieves his gun, borrows another from the town's merchant and enters the saloon, killing Ned first.  A gunfight ensues and ends with him killing Frank.  Outside, Dave Turner regretfully states that his job is to kill John Henry.  Having dropped his own gun and now only holding the heavier, borrowed gun, John Henry asks if he can return to the saloon to retrieve it - Dave agrees.  Inside, John Henry shoots McCurdy, who falls from the balcony in front of Dave.  Now unemployed, Dave and John Henry part ways peacefully.

Having now re-established his reputation as a gunslinger, John Henry informs a tearful Samuel that he must leave to avoid bringing bounty hunters and challengers to the town.  He promises to return, but according to Dave Turner's final voiceover, only returns once to affix a ribbon Mary Alice gave him before the war to her grave stone, a few times on the sly perhaps to visit his father, and then never again after his father's death.

Cast

Production
Kiefer Sutherland and Jon Cassar, who directed 58 episodes of Sutherland's TV series 24 had discussed for years the idea of doing a Western film together. Sutherland eventually commissioned Brad Mirman to write a screenplay for such a film, to co-star Sutherland's father, veteran actor Donald Sutherland. While the two had appeared together in two films previously—Max Dugan Returns (1983) and A Time to Kill (1996)—they had never shared a scene. Produced for $20 million, it began shooting in July 2013 at the CL Ranch in Springbank, Alberta, near Calgary, and was wrapped by September. It was also announced that Kevin DeWalt would produce under his Minds Eye Entertainment banner, with Josh Miller also producing under his Panacea Entertainment banner.

Principal photography began in July 2013, in Calgary, with a budget of $11 million.

In June 2015, some actors who had worked on the film two years earlier under ACTRA Alberta contracts, but who were still owed wages, were paid. The following month, approximately 100 members of the crew union IATSE local 212 and of the Directors Guild of Canada were in the process of being paid a total of $300,000 still owed. The Alberta Labour Relations Board had ruled in April 2015 that the production companies—Redemption Alberta Inc., Redemption Productions Inc., Panacea Entertainment Inc., Regina’s Minds Eye Entertainment Ltd., and Kiefer Sutherland’s Camel Entertainment Inc.—would not be allowed to access approximately $1.7-million in Alberta Film Grant money until issues with the film's workers and suppliers were resolved.

Release
Forsaken had its world premiere at the 2015 Toronto International Film Festival during its 40th anniversary, on September 16, 2015. Prior to the film's premiere at the festival, Momentum Pictures acquired U.S distribution rights to the film. It then went onto screen at the Zurich Film Festival on September 25, 2015, where Kiefer Sutherland won The Golden Eye Award. The film was released in the United States on February 19, 2016.

Reception
The film received mixed reviews from critics. Rotten Tomatoes gave it a 43% rating based on 40 reviews. Metacritic gave it 56/100 points based on 16 critics, labeling it "mixed or average".

Accolades
The film was nominated for 5 categories at the 4th Canadian Screen Awards: Art direction/Production design, cinematography, costume design, make-up and sound editing.

References

External links 
 
 
 

2015 films
2015 Western (genre) films
English-language Canadian films
2015 directorial debut films
Canadian Western (genre) films
Films set in 1872
Films directed by Jon Cassar
2015 drama films
2010s English-language films
2010s Canadian films